Heavy may refer to:

Measures
 Heavy, a characterization of objects with substantial weight
 Heavy, a wake turbulence category used by pilots and air traffic controllers to refer to aircraft with a maximum takeoff mass of 136,000 kgs or more 
 Heavy, a type of strength of Scottish beer
 Heavy reader, a reader of 21 or more books per year, according to the Pew Internet and American Life Project report, "The Rise of E-Reading" (2012)

Arts, entertainment, and media

Music

Groups
 The Heavy (band), a rock band from England

Albums
 Heavy (Heavy D album), 1999
 Heavy (Iron Butterfly album), a 1968 album by Iron Butterfly
 Heavy (Bin-Jip album), the second studio album by Bin-Jip

Songs
 "Heavy" (Collective Soul song), 1999
 "Heavy" (Lauri Ylönen song), 2011
 "Heavy" (Linkin Park song), 2017
 "Heavy" (Anne-Marie song), 2017
 "Heavy", by Cxloe, 2020
 "Heavy", by Flight Facilities featuring Your Smith, 2021
 "Heavy", by Peach PRC, 2021

Television
 Heavy (TV series), reality show on A&E that chronicles extreme weight loss
 Heavy: The Story of Metal, a four-part documentary special that aired on VH1 in 2006
 "Heavy" (House), a 2005 episode of the television series House

Other arts, entertainment, and media
 Heavy (film), a 1995 drama film
 Heavy or villain, the antagonist within a story
 Heavy Weapons Guy or Heavy, a class in the first-person shooter Team Fortress 2
 Heavy (website), an entertainment website

See also 

 Heavy D (disambiguation)
 
 
 Heavies (disambiguation)